The Buhai is a right tributary of the river Jijia in Romania. It discharges into the Jijia near the city Dorohoi.

References

Rivers of Romania
Rivers of Botoșani County